This is a list of mammal species recorded in the Palestinian territories of the Gaza Strip and the West Bank.

The following tags are used to highlight each species' conservation status as assessed by the International Union for Conservation of Nature:

Order: Hyracoidea (hyraxes) 

The hyraxes are four species of furry, cat-sized, thickset, herbivorous mammals that might resemble rodents at first glance, but have hooves and two caniniform incisors among other features that betray their distant evolutionary relation to elephants. They are native to Africa and the Middle East.

Family: Procaviidae (hyraxes)
Genus: Procavia
 Cape hyrax, Procavia capensis

Order: Rodentia (rodents) 

Rodents make up the largest order of mammals, with over 40% of mammalian species. They have two incisors in the upper and lower jaw which grow continually and must be kept short by gnawing.

Suborder: Hystricognathi
Family: Hystricidae (Old World porcupines)
Genus: Hystrix
 Indian porcupine, Hystrix indica 
Family: Myocastoridae (coypu)
Genus: Myocastor
 Coypu, Myocastor coypu  (introduced)
Suborder: Sciurognathi
Family: Sciuridae (squirrels)
Subfamily: Sciurinae
Genus: Sciurus
 Caucasian squirrel, Sciurus anomalus 
Family: Gliridae (dormice)
Subfamily: Leithiinae
Genus: Dryomys
 Forest dormouse, Dryomys nidetula 
Genus: Eliomys
 Asian garden dormouse, Eliomys melanurus 
Family: Dipodidae (jerboas)
Subfamily: Allactaginae
Genus: Allactaga
 Euphrates jerboa, Allactaga euphratica 
Subfamily: Dipodinae
Genus: Jaculus
 Lesser Egyptian jerboa, Jaculus jaculus 
 Greater Egyptian jerboa, Jaculus orientalis 
Family: Spalacidae (bamboo and mole rats)
Subfamily: Spalacinae
Genus: Spalax
 Palestine mole rat, Spalax ehrenbergi 
Family: Cricetidae (hamsters, voles, lemmings)
Subfamily: Cricetinae
Subfamily: Arvicolinae
Genus: Microtus
 Günther's vole, Microtus guentheri 
Family: Muridae (mice, rats, gerbils)
Subfamily: Deomyinae
Subfamily: Gerbillinae
Genus: Gerbillus
 Anderson's gerbil, Gerbillus andersoni 
 Wagner's gerbil, Gerbillus dasyurus 
 Flower's gerbil, Gerbillus floweri 
 Lesser Egyptian gerbil, Gerbillus gerbillus 
 Pygmy gerbil, Gerbillus henleyi 
 Balochistan gerbil, Gerbillus nanus 
Genus: Meriones
 Sundevall's jird, Meriones crassus 
 Libyan jird, Meriones libycus 
 Buxton's jird, Meriones sacramenti 
 Tristram's jird, Meriones tristrami 
Genus: Psammomys
 Sand rat, Psammomys obesus 
Genus: Sekeetamys
 Bushy-tailed jird, Sekeetamys calurus 
Subfamily: Murinae
Genus: Apodemus
 Yellow-necked mouse, Apodemus flavicollis 
 Steppe field mouse, Apodemus witherbyi 
Genus: Nesokia
 Short-tailed bandicoot rat, Nesokia indica 
Genus: Rattus
 Brown rat, Rattus norvegicus 
 Black rat, Rattus rattus 
Genus: Mus
 Macedonian mouse, Mus macedonicus 
 House mouse, Mus musculus 
Subfamily: Deomyinae
Genus: Acomys
 Eastern spiny mouse, Acomys dimidiatus 
 Golden spiny mouse, Acomys russatus

Order: Lagomorpha (rabbits, hares and picas) 

The lagomorphs comprise two families, Leporidae (hares and rabbits), and Ochotonidae (pikas). Though they can resemble rodents, and were classified as a superfamily in that order until the early 20th century, they have since been considered a separate order. They differ from rodents in a number of physical characteristics, such as having four incisors in the upper jaw rather than two.

Family: Leporidae (hares and rabbits)
Subfamily: Leporinae
Genus: Lepus
 Cape hare, Lepus capensis 
 European hare, Lepus europaeus

Order: Erinaceomorpha (hedgehogs and gymnures) 
The order Erinaceomorpha contains a single family, Erinaceidae, which comprise the hedgehogs and gymnures. The hedgehogs are easily recognised by their spines while gymnures look more like large rats.

Family: Erinaceidae (hedgehogs)
Subfamily: Erinaceinae
Genus: Erinaceus
 Southern white-breasted hedgehog, Erinaceus concolor 
Genus: Hemiechinus
 Long-eared hedgehog, Hemiechinus auritus 
Genus: Paraechinus
 Desert hedgehog, Paraechinus aethiopicus

Order: Soricomorpha (shrews, moles, and solenodons) 

The "shrew-forms" are insectivorous mammals. The shrews and solenodons closely resemble mice while the moles are stout bodied burrowers.

Family: Soricidae (shrews)
Subfamily: Crocidurinae
Genus: Crocidura
 Bicolored shrew, Crocidura leucodon 
 Lesser white-toothed shrew, Crocidura suaveolens 
 Negev shrew, Crocidura ramona 
Genus: Suncus
 Etruscan shrew, Suncus etruscus

Order: Chiroptera (bats) 

The bats' most distinguishing feature is that their forelimbs are developed as wings, making them the only mammals capable of flight. Bat species account for about 20% of all mammals.

Suborder: Megachiroptera
Family: Pteropodidae (flying foxes, Old World fruit bats)
Genus: Rousettus
 Egyptian fruit bat, Rousettus aegyptiacus 
Suborder: Microchiroptera
Family: Emballonuridae (sac-winged bats)
Genus: Taphozous
 Naked-rumped tomb bat, Taphozous nudiventris 
 Egyptian tomb bat, Taphozous perforatus 
Family: Hipposideridae (Old World leaf-nosed bats)
Genus: Asellia
 Trident bat, Asellia tridens 
Family: Molossidae (free-tailed bats)
Genus: Tadarida
 European free-tailed bat, Tadarida teniotis 
Family: Nycteridae (slit-faced bats)
Genus: Nycteris
 Egyptian slit-faced bat, Nycteris thebaica 
Family: Rhinolophidae (horseshoe bats)
Genus: Rhinolophus
 Blasius's horseshoe bat, Rhinolophus blasii 
 Geoffroy's horseshoe bat, Rhinolophus clivosus 
 Mediterranean horseshoe bat, Rhinolophus euryale 
 Greater horseshoe bat, Rhinolophus ferrumequinum 
 Lesser horseshoe bat, Rhinolophus hipposideros 
 Mehely's horseshoe bat, Rhinolophus mehelyi 
Family: Rhinopomatidae (mouse-tailed bats)
Genus: Rhinopoma
 Lesser mouse-tailed bat, Rhinopoma hardwickei 
 Greater mouse-tailed bat, Rhinopoma microphyllum 
Family: Vespertilionidae (vesper bats)
Genus: Eptesicus
 Botta's serotine, Eptesicus bottae 
 Serotine bat, Eptesicus serotinus 
Genus: Hypsugo
 Desert pipistrelle, Hypsugo ariel 
Genus: Miniopterus
 Common bent-wing bat, Miniopterus schreibersii CD
Genus: Myotis
 Lesser mouse-eared bat, Myotis blythii 
 Long-fingered bat, Myotis capaccinii 
 Geoffroy's bat, Myotis emarginatus 
 Natterer's bat, Myotis nattereri 
Genus: Nyctalus
 Common noctule, Nyctalus noctula 
Genus: Otonycteris
 Desert long-eared bat, Otonycteris hemprichii LR/
Genus: Pipistrellus
 Kuhl's pipistrelle, Pipistrellus kuhli 
 Rüppell's pipistrelle, Pipistrellus rueppellii

Order: Cetacea (whales) 

The order Cetacea includes whales, dolphins and porpoises. They are the mammals most fully adapted to aquatic life with a spindle-shaped nearly hairless body, protected by a thick layer of blubber, and forelimbs and tail modified to provide propulsion underwater.

Species listed below also includes species being recorded in Levantine Sea.

Suborder: Mysticeti
Family: Balaenopteridae
Genus: Balaenoptera
 Fin whale, Balaenoptera physalus 
 Common minke whale, Balaenoptera acutorostrata  
Subfamily: Megapterinae
Genus: Megaptera
 Humpback whale, Megaptera novaeangliae 
Suborder: Odontoceti
Family: Physeteridae (sperm whales)
Genus: Physeter
 Sperm whale, Physeter macrocephalus 
Family: Ziphiidae (beaked whales)
Genus: Hyperoodon
 Northern bottlenose whale, Hyperoodon ampullatus 
Genus: Mesoplodon
 Blainville's beaked whale, Mesoplodon densirostris 
Genus: Ziphius
 Cuvier's beaked whale, Ziphius cavirostris 
Genus: Mesoplodon
 Gervais' beaked whale, Ziphius cavirostris 
Family: Delphinidae (oceanic dolphins)
Genus: Delphinus
 Short-beaked common dolphin, Delphinus delphis 
Genus: Grampus
 Risso's dolphin, Grampus griseus 
Genus: Pseudorca
 False killer whale, Pseudorca crassidens 
Genus: Stenella
 Striped dolphin, Stenella coeruleoalba 
 Pantropical spotted dolphin, Stenella attenuata
Genus: Sousa
 Sousa chinensis 
Genus: Steno
 Rough-toothed dolphin, Steno bredanensis 
Genus: Tursiops
 Common bottlenose dolphin, Tursiops truncatus 
Genus: Grampus
 Risso's dolphin, Grampus griseus 
Genus: Orcinus
 Orca, Orcinus orca 
Genus: Pseudorca
 False killer whale, Pseudorca crassidens 
Genus: Globicephala
 Long-finned pilot whale, Globicephala melas

Order: Carnivora (carnivorans) 

There are over 260 species of carnivorans, the majority of which feed primarily on meat. They have a characteristic skull shape and dentition.

Suborder: Feliformia
Family: Felidae (cats)
Genus: Caracal
 Caracal, C. caracal 
Genus: Felis
 Jungle cat, F. chaus 
 African wildcat, F. lybica 
Family: Herpestidae (mongooses)
Genus: Herpestes
 Egyptian mongoose, H. ichneumon 
Family: Hyaenidae (hyaenas)
Genus: Hyaena
 Striped hyena, H. hyaena 
Suborder: Caniformia
Family: Canidae (dogs, foxes)
Genus: Canis
 Golden jackal, C. aureus 
Persian jackal, C. a. aureus 
Syrian jackal, C. a. syriacus
 Gray wolf, C. lupus 
 Arabian wolf, C. l. arabs 
 Indian wolf, C. l. pallipes
Genus: Vulpes
 Blanford's fox, V. cana 
 Rüppell's fox, V. rueppellii 
 Red fox, V. vulpes 
Family: Mustelidae (mustelids)
Genus: Martes
 Beech marten, M. foina 
Genus: Meles
 Caucasian badger, M. canescens 
Genus: Mellivora
 Honey badger, M. capensis 
Genus: Vormela
 Marbled polecat, V. peregusna 
Suborder: Pinnipedia
Family: Phocidae (earless seals)
Genus: Monachus
 Mediterranean monk seal, M. monachus

Order: Artiodactyla (even-toed ungulates) 

The even-toed ungulates are ungulates whose weight is borne about equally by the third and fourth toes, rather than mostly or entirely by the third as in perissodactyls. There are about 220 artiodactyl species, including many that are of great economic importance to humans.

Family: Suidae (pigs)
Subfamily: Suinae
Genus: Sus
 Wild boar, S. scrofa 
Family: Bovidae (cattle, antelopes, goats)
Subfamily: Antilopinae
Genus: Gazella
 Arabian gazelle, G. arabica 
 Dorcas gazelle, G. dorcas 
Subfamily: Caprinae
Genus: Capra
 Nubian ibex, C. nubiana

Locally extinct
The following species are locally extinct in Palestine:
 Cheetah, Acinonyx jubatus
 Addax, Addax nasomaculatus 
 Hartebeest, Alcelaphus buselaphus 
 Roe deer, Capreolus capreolus
 Red deer, Cervus elaphus
 Persian fallow deer, Dama mesopotamica
 Onager, Equus hemionus
 Sand cat, Felis margarita
 Arabian oryx, Oryx leucoryx
 Lion, Panthera leo
 Leopard, Panthera pardus
 Brown bear, Ursus arctos

See also
List of chordate orders
Lists of mammals by region
List of prehistoric mammals
Mammal classification
List of mammals described in the 2000s

Notes

References
 Aulagnier, S. et al. (2008) Guide des mammifères d'Europe, d'Afrique du Nord et de Moyen-Orient. Delachaux et Niestlé, Paris
 McDonald, D. & Barrett, P. (1993) Collins Field Guide. Mammals of Britain and Europe. HarperCollins Publishers, London
 Reeves, R.R. et al. (2002) Sea Mammals of the World. A & C Black, London
 IUCN Red List - The Red List of Threatened Species

Palestine
mammals
'Palestine